Galagete espanolaensis is a moth in the family Autostichidae. It was described by Bernard Landry in 2002. It is found on the Galápagos Islands.

Etymology
The species name refers to Española Island, where it was found.

References

Moths described in 2002
Galagete